The Galaxy Kings is an album by Austin, Texas, singer-songwriter Bob Schneider, released in a limited edition of 1000 copies by Vanguard Records in 2002.

Track listing
All songs written by Bob Schneider.

2002 albums
Bob Schneider albums
Vanguard Records albums